The Mazanderani people or Tabari people ( or ) are an Iranian people who are indigenous to the Caspian sea region of Iran. They are also referred to as Mazanis for short. They inhabit the southern coast of the Caspian Sea and are part of the historical region known as Tabaristan. The Alborz mountains mark the southern boundary of the area settled by the Mazanderani people.

People 

The number of Mazanderani was 4,480,000 in 2019 
The Mazanderani number between three and four million (2006 estimate). Their dominant religion is Shi'a Islam.

Mazandarani people have a background in the Tabari ethnicity, and speak the Tabari language. Their origin goes back to Tapuri people and Amardi people. Their land was called Tapuria or Tapurestan, the land of Tapuris.

Most Mazanderanis live on the southeastern coast of the Caspian Sea. Their traditional professions are farming and fishing. The Mazanderanis are closely related to the neighbouring Gilaki people as well as South Caucasian peoples (e.g., the Georgians, Armenians, and Azerbaijanis).

Language 

The Mazanderani language is a Northwestern Iranian language spoken by the Mazanderani people; however, most Mazanderanis are also fluent in Persian. The Gilaki and Mazanderani languages (but not other Iranian languages) share certain typological features with Caucasian languages.

With the growth of education and the media, the distinction between Mazanderani and other Iranian languages is likely to disappear. Mazanderani is closely related to Gilaki and the two languages have similar vocabularies. They preserve more of the noun declension system characteristic of older Iranian languages than Persian does.

Assistant professor Maryam Borjian of Rutgers University states that Mazanderani has different sub-dialects and there is high mutual intelligibility among Mazanderani sub-dialects.

The dialects of Mazanderani are Saravi, Amoli, Baboli, Ghaemshahri, Chalusi, Nuri, Shahsavari, Ghasrani, Shahmirzadi, Damavandi, Firoozkoohi, Astarabadi and Katouli. The native people of Sari, Shahi, Babol, Amol, Nowshahr, Chalus, and Tonekabon are Mazanderani people and speak the Mazanderani language.

Genetics 

The Mazanderani and the closely related Gilaks occupy the south Caspian region of Iran and speak languages belonging to the North-Western branch of Iranian languages. It has been suggested that their ancestors came from the Caucasus region, perhaps displacing an earlier group in the South Caspian. Linguistic evidence supports this scenario, in that the Gilaki and Mazanderani languages (but not other Iranian languages) share certain typological features with Caucasian languages.

Based on mtDNA HV1 sequences, the Gilaki and Mazanderani most closely resemble their geographic and linguistic neighbors, namely other Iranian groups. However, their Y chromosome types most closely resemble those found in groups from the South Caucasus. Researchers have interpreted these differences as demonstrating that peoples from the Caucasus settled in the south Caspian area and mated with peoples from local Iranian groups, possibly because of patrilocality.(But this is just a theory) The Mazanderani and Gilaki groups are closely related on the male side with populations from the South Caucasus such as Georgians, Armenians, and Azerbaijani's.

Haplogroups 
Analysis of their NRY patrilines has revealed haplogroup J2, associated with the neolithic diffusion of agriculturalists from the Near East, to be the predominant Y-DNA lineage among the Mazanderani (subclades J2a3h-M530, J2a3b-M67 and J2a-M410, more specifically.). The next most frequently occurring lineage, R1a1a, believed to have been associated with early Iranian expansion into Central/Southern Eurasia and currently ubiquitous in that area, is found in almost 25%,. This haplogroup, with the aforementioned J2, accounts for over 50% of the entire sample. Haplogroup G2a3b, attaining significant frequency together with G2a and G1, is the most commonly carried marker in the G group among Mazanderani men. The lineages E1b1b1a1a-M34 and C5-M356 comprise the remainder, of less than 10% sampled.

Notable figures

Historic 
 Abu Jafar Muhammad ibn Jarir ibn Yazid ibn Kathir al-Tabari  (838–923) was a Mazanderani historian and theologian (the most famous and widely influential person called al-Tabari).
 Abu Jafar Muhammad ibn Jarir ibn Rustom al-Tabari was a Shia thinker who is commonly confused with the former. He is the author of the book Dala'il al-Imamah (Proofs of the Imamate)
 Ali ibn Sahl Rabban al-Tabari, "Ali the scholar from Tabiristan" (838–870 A.D.), was the writer of a medical encyclopedia and the teacher of the scholar physician Zakariya al-Razi.
 Abul Hasan al-Tabari, a 10th-century Iranian physician
 Al-Tabarani (c. 821–918 CE), author of numerous hadith
 Amir Pazevari, poet
 Maziar, Iranian aristocrat of the House of Karen

Contemporary 
 Reza Shah, emperor of Iran (Persia) from 1924 to 1941
 Nima Yooshij, poet, 1941
 Mina Assadi, poet
 Emamali Habibi, Olympic and world champion of free-style wrestling/Babr e Mazandaran
 Ali Larijani, former member of the Supreme National Security Council of Iran and Speaker of the Majlis of Iran
 Simin Ghanem, Iranian classical and pop singer
 Hassan Yazdani, Iranian Wrestler
 Komeil Ghasemi, Wrestler
 Mohammad Javad Larijani, mathematician and former member of the Majlis
 Sadegh Larijani, head of the judiciary of the Islamic Republic of Iran
 Mohammad Zohari, poet
 Mohsen Bengar, footballer
 Delkash, singer
 Ali Pahlavan, singer
 Ehsan Tabari, Marxist theoretician
 Noureddin Kianouri, politician
 Parinaz Izadyar, Actress 
 Parviz Natel-Khanlari, writer/translator
 Reza Allamehzadeh, director
 Behdad Salimikordasiabi, Olympic weightlifter
 Mohammad Donyavi, musician
 Abdollah Movahed, Freestyle Wrestler - Olympics Champion
 Mohammad-Ali Taskhiri, Shia Cleric & Diplomat
 Yasubedin Rastegar Jooybari, Shia Marja 
 Abdollah Javadi-Amoli, Shia Marja & Politician
 Mirza Hashem Amoli, Shia Marja

Assimilated populations in Mazandaran
In the Safavid, Afsharid, and Qajar eras Mazandaran was settled by large numbers of Georgians, Circassians, Armenians and other peoples of the Caucasus, whose descendants still live across Mazandaran. The names of many towns, villages and neighbourhoods in Mazandaran reflect this legacy by bearing variations of the name "Gorji" (i.e., Georgian), although most of the Georgians are assimilated into the mainstream Mazanderanis. The history of Georgian settlement is described by Iskandar Beg Munshi, the author of the 17th century History of Alam Aray Abbasi. In addition, European travelers such as Chardin and Della Valle have written about their encounters with the Georgian, Circassian and Armenian Mazanderanis.

See also 
 Caspian people
 Māzandarān Province
 Peoples of the Caucasus
 Iranian peoples
 List of famous people from Mazandaran
 Mazanderani language
 Mazanderani dance

References 

 01
Iranian ethnic groups
Ethnic groups in Iran
.
History of Mazandaran Province
Tabaristan
Mazanderani language
Ethnic groups in the Middle East